Rainbow Falls is the name of several waterfalls:

New Zealand:
 Rainbow Falls (Waianiwaniwa), at Kerikeri
 Aniwaniwa Falls (Rainbow Falls) near Lake Waikaremoana
Canada:
Rainbow Falls, British Columbia
United States:
 Rainbow Falls, Adirondack State Park, New York
 Rainbow Falls (California), Devils Postpile National Monument, California
 Rainbow Falls (Chattooga River), Cashiers, North Carolina
 Rainbow Falls (Chelan County), Stehekin, Washington
 Rainbow Falls (Hawaii), Hilo, Hawaii
 Rainbow Falls (Horsepasture River), Transylvania County, North Carolina
 Rainbow Falls (Manitou Springs, Colorado)
 Rainbow Falls (Michigan), Black River, Michigan
 Rainbow Falls (Missouri River), Great Falls, Montana
 Rainbow Falls (Montana), Glacier National Park
 Rainbow Falls (Rutherford County), Rutherford County, North Carolina
 Rainbow Falls State Park, Lewis County, Washington

Computing Systems:
 SPARC T3, a microprocessor also known as "Rainbow Falls"

Other:
 Rainbow Falls Trail
 Rainbow Falls, an episode of the fourth season of My Little Pony: Friendship Is Magic